Zigama Credit and Savings Bank (ZCSB), is a microfinance bank in Rwanda. The bank is one of the financial institutions licensed by the National Bank of Rwanda, the national banking regulator.

History
ZCSB was established in 1997 as Zigama Credit & Savings Society (ZCSS), also referred to as Zigama CSS, with its primary mission to serve the welfare of Rwanda's military families. In 2011, the institution received a commercial banking license and rebranded to its current name. Since Its formation, the cooperative
bank has accepted membership from Rwanda Police Force and Rwanda Correctional Services.

Overview
The bank is a licensed cooperative bank, serving its members in Rwanda. , the total asset valuation of the institution was in excess of US$143 million (RWF:90 billion).

Ownership
, the detailed shareholding in the stock of Zigama Credit and Savings Bank are not publicly known. The bank is majority owned and administered by members of the Rwanda Defence Forces.

Branch network
As of December 2011, ZCSB maintains branches at the following locations:
 
 Main Branch - Kimihurura, Kigali
 Nyarugenge Branch - Nyarugenge, Kigali
 Kacyiru Branch - Kacyiru, Kigali
 Kanombe Branch - Kanombe, Kigali
 Kibungo Branch - Kibungo, Ngoma District
 Butare Branch - Butare, Huye District 
 Ruhengeri Branch - Ruhengeri, Musanze District
 Cyangugu Branch - Cyangugu, Rusizi District
 Gisenyi Branch - Gisenyi, Rubavu District
 Byumba Branch - Byumba, Gicumbi District
 Kibuye Branch - Kibuye, Karongi District
 Nyagatare Branch - Nyagatare, Nyagatare District
 Gitarama Branch - Gitarama, Muhanga District

See also
 List of banks in Rwanda
 Economy of Rwanda

References

External links
 
 Website of National Bank of Rwanda

Banks of Rwanda
Banks established in 1997
1997 establishments in Rwanda
Organisations based in Kigali
Economy of Kigali